Stanley Hand Tools is a brand of hand tools. It is a division of Stanley Black & Decker, following the merger of The Stanley Works with Black & Decker in March 2010.

History 
The Stanley Works was founded by Frederick Trent Stanley in 1843, originally a bolt and door hardware manufacturing company located in New Britain, Connecticut.

The Stanley Rule and Level Company was founded in 1857 by Frederick Trent Stanley's cousin, Henry Stanley, also in New Britain. In 1920, this company merged with the Stanley Works, and continued operating as its hand tools division.

Around 1937, Stanley acquired the British J. A. Chapman company, a British manufacturer of carpentry tools and other items (including bayonets during World War I) formerly located in Sheffield, from Norman Neill. This helped Stanley to enter the British market.

Products 

Stanley is a well known brand of tools and has produced millions of hand planes, saws, rulers, try squares, chisels, screwdrivers, and many other types of tools for consumer and for industrial use. Their innovations include the Bailey plane, the Surform shaper, the PowerLock tape measure, the utility knife, and an unusual multitool known as the Stanley #1 Odd Jobs.

Gallery

References

External links 

 Stanley Hand Tools website (US)
 Stanley Hand Tools website (UK)
 Stanley Hand Tools website (CA)
 Handy Tools Home (CA)

Tool manufacturing companies of the United States
American brands
Stanley Black & Decker brands
American companies established in 1857
Manufacturing companies established in 1857
1857 establishments in Connecticut